Pencilmation is an American animated comedy web series on YouTube created by Ross Bollinger. The series follows the endless struggle between creator and creation, in which pencil-drawn stick figures and doodles come to life and grapple against the torment of their animator's pencil and his arsenal of other drawing implements. The cartoon can be recognized by its trademark ruled paper backdrop, traditional frame-by-frame animation technique, inclusion of pencils and other drawing material, energetic music, classic cartoonish sound effects, simplistic character designs, and a mix of slapstick, situational comedy, meta, and doodle-based humor.

As of December 2021, Pencilmation is the 260th most subscribed channel, the 225th most viewed channel, the 104th most subscribed channel from the US, the 15th most subscribed channel in the Film category, and the largest (most subscribed and most viewed) 2D Animation-focused original creator channel on all of YouTube.

History 
At age 16, after being inspired from watching the Daffy Duck cartoon Duck Amuck, Bollinger created the first Pencilmation cartoon in Macromedia Flash and uploaded it to Newgrounds.com.  Bollinger worked alone and was responsible for every aspect of creating the cartoon, including writing, drawing, animating, sound design, and composing, a trend that would more or less continue for the first few dozen Pencilmation episodes.

2004–2008: Beginnings 
On June 4, 2004, Bollinger uploaded the very first Pencilmation cartoon onto Newgrounds. It was received with high praise and would end up being awarded a Daily Feature from the site. One year later, on October 31, 2005, Bollinger would upload the second installment, Pencilmation #2. This too was well received and ended up winning a Frontpaged award along with other accolades. Between 2004 and 2006, Bollinger would upload onto Newgrounds these first two episodes of Pencilmation, two installments of the short-lived sister series Infinity Snail which takes place in the same Pencilmation universe, two installments of the short-lived dialogue-based Generic Brand Cartoons, and a one-off titled A Sad Swim.

2009–2011: Early YouTube era 
After a 3-year hiatus, Bollinger returned to his Pencilmation series, uploading all previous episodes onto his new YouTube channel and producing a total of ten new episodes during 2009. In April 2010, Pencilmation #10, Hook, Line and Stinker, won 1st Place in Animation at the 31st College Television Awards hosted by the Academy of Television Arts and Sciences Foundation.

2011–2012: Hank Hanky period 
After the release of Pencilmation #19, Bollinger branched out to other projects. A four-part sister series titled Mythtory of the World was created.  Also during this time, Hank Hanky, a figure who had been featured in a number of Pencilmation episodes and came to overshadow the original Pencilmation lead figure, was highly emphasized. The recognizable style of pencils drawing dialogue-absent doodles coming to life on a ruled paper background was dropped in favor of more traditional methods and having Hank speak. A few segments dubbed "The Hank Hanky Show" were produced, where viewers (mostly children) called a toll-free number to leave voice messages for Hank to answer.  During this time, Bollinger drastically changed the layout of his official Pencilmation site and that of the Pencilmation Facebook page, pretending he was Hank taking over the program.

2012–2014: Return to form 
At the start of Pencilmations Season 2 in mid-2012, Pencilmation #20 was produced.  Following these new episodes, Hank Hanky and all non-Pencilmation material was soon phased out, with few exceptions down the road.

 2014–2017: Early collaborative period 
For the first 36 episodes of Pencilmation, barring music and occasional animation assistance, Bollinger did all of the work solely by himself.  From Pencilmation #37 onward, a trend began that saw Bollinger delegating more and more responsibilities to other creatives, whether it be with the writing, animation, sound design, composing, or voice acting.  Bollinger would stay on as director and executive producer, and then eventually just executive producer and occasional writer.

 2017–2018: Early production team period 
By this period, Pencilmation had become a well-oiled machine, each intricate process handled by several hands, the animation style becoming much more extravagant and sophisticated. Several new episodes were being produced every week, a process that once took Bollinger several weeks per episode by himself.  A regular cast of recurring characters had been established.

 2018–present: Rise in popularity 
In 2019, Pencilmation was featured in YouTube's annual YouTube Rewind, being acknowledged as the third most viewed creator channel of the year with 2.8 billion views.  Between 2018 and 2020, Pencilmation's subscriber count exploded from a little more than 1 million to over 18 million, the channel views count from tens of millions to over 9 billion. This was largely in part due to YouTube's internal algorithm promoting videos on its YouTube Kids platform, as well as considerable exposure from being included as a part of the 2019 YouTube Rewind video recap. By the end of 2020, Bollinger and company had produced the 500th episode of Pencilmation.

Today, Pencilmation is still helmed by Bollinger and employs a global, remote team of hundreds of artists, writers, and production staff.

Characters

Main CastPencilmate (voiced by Joe Porter, Ross Bollinger, Oswald Garrington, and Leif Grant), the main protagonist throughout the series.  Color: blue. The tormented yet tenacious leader of the Pencilmation gang.Pencilmiss (voiced by Kesh Mesha, Ama Bollinger, Daphne Garrington, and Katie Snyder), the secondary protagonist throughout the series. Color: pink. The assertive, smart, and sweet character with a bit of a silly side.  She is Pencilmate's romantic companion.Mini-Pencilmate AKA Mini P (voiced by Joe Porter, Ross Bollinger, Oswald Garrington, and Leif Grant). Color: yellow. The hyper and mischievous young neighborhood boy who pals around with Pencilmate and crew. He is constantly finding himself in trouble.Tall Guy (voiced by Joe Porter, Oswald Garrington, and Leif Grant). Color: orange. The high-strung but friendly member of the ensemble.Big Guy AKA Big Red Block and/or Red Box Guy (voiced by Joe Porter, Oswald Garrington, and Leif Grant). Color: red. The strong yet sometimes cowardly gentle giant of the group.Granny (voiced by Kesh Mesha, Ama Bollinger, and Daphne Garrington). Color: green. The sneaky and beguiling wise elder of the crew.Lil' Miss (voiced by Kesh Mesha, Ama Bollinger, and Daphne Garrington). Color: purple. The cute, caring little neighborhood girl whom Pencilmate and Pencilmiss look out after.Tiny Pencilmate (voiced by Joe Porter, Ross Bollinger, Oswald Garrington, and Leif Grant). Color: brown. The antagonist of the series. He was defeated in "Bad Sportsmanship".

Other Characters Infinity Snail. The mute gastropod drifter whose inexplicable luck finds him saving the day through the power of coincidence.Hank Hanky' (voiced by Ross Bollinger and Joe Porter). The thick-browed, overalls-wearing little rambunctious loudmouth who loves stealing the show and speaking his mind. Starred in The Hank Hanky Show where callers would ask Hank for advice with their personal problems.

References

External links

2000s YouTube series
2004 web series debuts
2010s YouTube series
2020s YouTube series
American animated web series
American comedy web series
Flash cartoons
Animated television series without speech